LeeAnne Walters is an American environmental activist from Flint, Michigan. She became known for her role in exposing the Flint water crisis. In 2016, Walters was honored with the PEN America's Freedom of Expression Courage Award. The 2017 television drama film Flint is based on the toxic water disaster. In the film, Betsy Brandt played the character of Walters. Walters was awarded the Goldman Environmental Prize in 2018, for her key role in exposing the Flint water contamination crisis. On February 3, 2016, Walters testified before the United States House Committee on Oversight and Reform about her work during the water crisis.

References 

Date of birth unknown
Living people
People from Flint, Michigan
American environmentalists
Year of birth missing (living people)
Activists from Michigan
Goldman Environmental Prize awardees
21st-century American women